This is a list of Singaporean films, including foreign films which involved collaborations or co-productions with Singaporean film makers or artists, marked accordingly in the list as follows:

Films by year
Singaporean films by chronological order since 1927. All fiscal figures in Singapore dollars unless otherwise specified.

1927–1939

1940s

1990s

2000

2001

2002

2003

2004

2005

2006

2007

2008

2009

2010

2011

2012

2013

2014

2015

2016

2017

2018

2019

2020

2021

2022

2023

See also
List of movies set in Singapore
Cinema of Singapore

References

Sources
Singapore Film Commission - Made by Singapore Films (1933-1990)
Singapore Film Commission - Made by Singapore Films (1991-2006)
Golden Village Cinemas
MDA LIST OF SINGAPORE MOVIES (1991-2013)
A Nut Shell Review List of Singapore Movies
Singapore Box Office Mojo
Singapore Film Commission - Film Brochure 2019
Singapore Film Commission - Film Brochure 2020
 Singapore Film Commission